Octobass flute  may refer to:

The contrabass flute, an instrument in the key of C pitched two octaves below the concert flute and one octave below the bass flute
The double contrabass flute, an instrument in the key of C pitched three octaves below the concert flute, two octaves below the bass flute, and one octave below the contrabass flute